Nogometni klub Odranci, commonly referred to as NK Odranci or simply Odranci, is a Slovenian football club which plays in the town of Odranci. The club was established in 1973.

Honours
Slovenian Third League
 Winners: 2010–11, 2014–15

Pomurska League (fourth tier)
 Winners: 2004–05, 2005–06

References

External links
Official website 

Association football clubs established in 1973
Football clubs in Slovenia
1973 establishments in Slovenia